Jonathan Lindsay Penner (born March 5, 1962) is an American actor, screenwriter, television personality, and film producer, known for producing and starring in the film The Last Supper, as well as acting in the television series Rude Awakening and The Naked Truth. He is also known for his multiple appearances on the American competitive reality series Survivor.

Life and career
Penner was born in New York City. He has had roles in television series Grapevine, The Naked Truth and Rude Awakening, and guest-starred on Seinfeld, CSI, CSI: NY, The Tick, Melrose Place, LateLine, Arrested Development, and The Nanny, where he appeared in two episodes as Danny Imperiali, whose firing and dumping of fiancée Fran Fine kicked off the entire series.

Penner has appeared in many films, with featured roles in Anarchy TV, Down Periscope, and The Last Supper, the latter of which he also co-produced, and which was directed by his wife, Stacy Title.

He had a small role in Dragon: The Bruce Lee Story (1993). Penner was nominated for Best Live Action Short Film at the Academy Awards in 1994 for Down on the Waterfront, which he co-produced, co-wrote, and starred in, along with Jason Alexander and Edward Asner.

He co-wrote the script for the 2003 The WB-produced re-imagining of The Lone Ranger, and later the 2017 horror film The Bye Bye Man. He is developing a King Kong television series for MarVista Entertainment and IM Global Television.

Penner resides in Los Angeles, California, with his two children: Ava, born in 1999, and Cooper, born in 1995. He was married to director Stacy Title from 1991 until her death in 2021; he was introduced to Stacy by his friend Jason Alexander, who is married to Stacy's cousin, Daena Title.

Filmography

Survivor
In addition to his acting and writing credits, Penner is perhaps best known as a three-time contestant on Survivor.

Cook Islands

Penner was a contestant on Survivor: Cook Islands in 2006. He was one of the original five members of the Rarotonga tribe (Raro). He quickly became notorious among the cast for stealing another tribe's chicken on the first day. In episode three, the four tribes evenly divided into two new mixed tribes, Aitutaki and Rarotonga.  Penner found himself on Aitutaki (Aitu).  While a member of Aitu, he became part of an alliance that consisted of Yul Kwon, Candice Woodcock, Becky Lee and Sundra Oakley. This alliance lasted until episode eight when the members of Aitu and Raro were offered a chance to mutiny by joining the opposing tribe. Penner, along with Woodcock, chose to leave Aitu for Raro, the only two castaways to accept the offer. After the merge, he flipped again and voted with the former Aitus. Ultimately, Kwon voted him out to appease the former Raro members, who viewed Penner as duplicitous for having betrayed them. He was the fourteenth person voted out, finishing in seventh place.  As his torch was snuffed, he turned to the Final Six and said, "And I'd like my hat back at some point", then left (Kwon actually did bring his hat back to him at the next Tribal Council). Penner humbly voted for Kwon to win in the Final Tribal Council.

Micronesia

Penner was also a contestant on Survivor: Micronesia  Fans vs. Favorites, the 16th season of Survivor which aired in 2008. He was one of ten returning favorites on the Malakal tribe and later switched to Airai. He was removed from the game during the sixth episode, due to a life-threatening infection in his injured knee. The Survivor medics stated that he had no choice but to be evacuated from the game as the sixth person to leave the competition.

Philippines

Penner returned to play the game for a third time on Survivor: Philippines, the 25th season of Survivor. He was one of the three returning players who had been medically evacuated during their previous season, the others being Michael Skupin (Survivor: The Australian Outback) and Russell Swan (Survivor: Samoa). During the season, Penner worked quite closely with castaway and fellow actress Lisa Whelchel. He ended up being the 11th person voted out, placing seventh overall, which is where he had also finished the first time he participated on Survivor. At the Final Tribal Council, he voted for Denise Stapley to win after claiming that Skupin and Whelchel were "ridden in like oxen" by Stapley, who indeed proved to be the eventual winner.

In total, Penner has spent 78 days playing the Survivor game. In an interview following his departure from Survivor: Philippines, he said he would be open to returning for another season.

References

External links

Jonathan Penner biography for Survivor: Cook Islands at CBS.com
Jonathan Penner biography for Survivor: Micronesia at CBS.com
Jonathan Penner biography for Survivor: Philippines at CBS.com

1962 births
Living people
Screenwriters from California
American male film actors
American male screenwriters
American male television actors
Film producers from California
Jewish American male actors
Male actors from New York City
Survivor (American TV series) contestants
Writers from Los Angeles
Screenwriters from New York (state)
Film producers from New York (state)
21st-century American Jews